Detective fiction is a subgenre of crime fiction and mystery fiction in which an investigator or a detective—whether professional, amateur or retired—investigates a crime, often murder. The detective genre began around the same time as speculative fiction and other genre fiction in the mid-nineteenth century and has remained extremely popular, particularly in novels. Some of the most famous heroes of detective fiction include C. Auguste Dupin, Sherlock Holmes, and Hercule Poirot. Juvenile stories featuring The Hardy Boys, Nancy Drew, and The Boxcar Children have also remained in print for several decades.

History

Ancient
Some scholars, such as R. H. Pfeiffer,  have suggested that certain ancient and religious texts bear similarities to what would later be called detective fiction. In the Old Testament story of Susanna and the Elders (the Protestant Bible locates this story within the apocrypha), the account told by two witnesses broke down when Daniel cross-examines them. In response, author Julian Symons has argued that "those who search for fragments of detection in the Bible and Herodotus are looking only for puzzles" and that these puzzles are not detective stories. In the play Oedipus Rex by Ancient Greek playwright Sophocles, Oedipus investigates the unsolved murder of King Laius and discovers the truth after questioning various witnesses that he himself is the culprit. Although "Oedipus's enquiry is based on supernatural, pre-rational methods that are evident in most narratives of crime until the development of Enlightenment thought in the seventeenth and eighteenth centuries", this narrative has "all of the central characteristics and formal elements of the detective story, including a mystery surrounding a murder, a closed circle of suspects, and the gradual uncovering of a hidden past."

Early Arabic
The One Thousand and One Nights contains several of the earliest detective stories, anticipating modern detective fiction. The oldest known example of a detective story was "The Three Apples", one of the tales narrated by Scheherazade in the One Thousand and One Nights (Arabian Nights). In this story, a fisherman discovers a heavy, locked chest along the Tigris river, which he then sells to the Abbasid Caliph, Harun al-Rashid. When Harun breaks open the chest, he discovers the body of a young woman who has been cut into pieces. Harun then orders his vizier, Ja'far ibn Yahya, to solve the crime and to find the murderer within three days, or be executed if he fails in his assignment. Suspense is generated through multiple plot twists that occur as the story progressed. With these characteristics this may be considered an archetype for detective fiction. It anticipates the use of reverse chronology in modern detective fiction, where the story begins with a crime before presenting a gradual reconstruction of the past.

The main difference between Ja'far ("The Three Apples") and later fictional detectives, such as Sherlock Holmes and Hercule Poirot, is that Ja'far has no actual desire to solve the case. The whodunit mystery is solved when the murderer himself confessed his crime. This in turn leads to another assignment in which Ja'far has to find the culprit who instigated the murder within three days or else be executed. Ja'far again fails to find the culprit before the deadline, but owing to chance, he discovers a key item. In the end, he manages to solve the case through reasoning in order to prevent his own execution.

On the other hand, two other Arabian Nights stories, "The Merchant and the Thief" and "Ali Khwaja", contain two of the earliest fictional detectives, who uncover clues and present evidence to catch or convict a criminal known to the audience, with the story unfolding in normal chronology and the criminal already known to the audience. The latter involves a climax where the titular detective protagonist Ali Khwaja presents evidence from expert witnesses in a court.

Early Chinese
Gong'an fiction (公案小说, literally："case records of a public law court") is the earliest known genre of Chinese detective fiction.

Some well-known stories include the Yuan dynasty story Circle of Chalk (Chinese: 灰闌記), the Ming dynasty story collection Bao Gong An (Chinese: 包公案) and the 18th century Di Gong An (Chinese: 狄公案) story collection. The latter was translated into English as Celebrated Cases of Judge Dee by Dutch sinologist Robert Van Gulik, who then used the style and characters to write the original Judge Dee series.

The hero/detective of these novels was typically a traditional judge or similar official based on historical personages such as Judge Bao (Bao Qingtian) or Judge Dee (Di Renjie). Although the historical characters may have lived in an earlier period (such as the Song or Tang dynasty) most stories are written in the later Ming or Qing dynasty period.

These novels differ from the Western style tradition in several points as described by Van Gulik:
 The detective is the local magistrate who is usually involved in several unrelated cases simultaneously;
 The criminal is introduced at the very beginning of the story and his crime and reasons are carefully explained, thus constituting an inverted detective story rather than a "puzzle";
 The stories have a supernatural element with ghosts telling people about their death and even accusing the criminal;
 The stories are filled with digressions into philosophy, the complete texts of official documents, and much more, resulting in long books; and
 The novels tend to have a huge cast of characters, typically in the hundreds, all described with their relation to the various main actors in the story.

Van Gulik chose Di Gong An to translate because in his view it was closer to the Western literary style and more likely to appeal to non-Chinese readers.

A number of Gong An works may have been lost or destroyed during the Literary Inquisitions and the wars in ancient China. In the traditional Chinese culture, this genre was low-prestige, and therefore was less worthy of preservation than works such as philosophy or poetry. Only little or incomplete case volumes can be found; for example, the only copy of Di Gong An was found at a second-hand book store in Tokyo, Japan.

Early Western

One of the earliest examples of detective fiction in Western Literature is Voltaire's Zadig (1748), which features a main character who performs feats of analysis. Things as They Are; or, The Adventures of Caleb Williams (1794) by William Godwin portrays the law as protecting the murderer and destroying the innocent. Thomas Skinner Sturr's anonymous Richmond, or stories in the life of a Bow Street officer was published in London in 1827; the Danish crime story The Rector of Veilbye by Steen Steensen Blicher was written in 1829; and the Norwegian crime novel Mordet paa Maskinbygger Roolfsen ("The Murder of Engine Maker Roolfsen") by Maurits Hansen was published in December 1839.

"Das Fräulein von Scuderi" is an 1819 short story by E. T. A. Hoffmann, in which Mlle de Scudery establishes the innocence of the police's favorite suspect in the murder of a jeweller. This story is sometimes cited as the first detective story and as a direct influence on Edgar Allan Poe's "The Murders in the Rue Morgue" (1841). Also suggested as a possible influence on Poe is ‘The Secret Cell’, a short story published in September 1837 by William Evans Burton. It has been suggested that this story may have been known to Poe, who in 1839 worked for Burton. The story was about a London policeman who solves the mystery of a kidnapped girl. Burton's fictional detective relied on practical methods such as dogged legwork, knowledge of the underworld and undercover surveillance, rather than brilliance of imagination or intellect.

English genre establishment
Detective fiction in the English-speaking world is considered to have begun in 1841 with the publication of Poe's "The Murders in the Rue Morgue", featuring "the first fictional detective, the eccentric and brilliant C. Auguste Dupin". When the character first appeared, the word detective had not yet been used in English; however, the character's name, "Dupin", originated from the English word dupe or deception. Poe devised a "plot formula that's been successful ever since, give or take a few shifting variables." Poe followed with further Auguste Dupin tales: "The Mystery of Marie Rogêt" in 1842 and "The Purloined Letter" in 1844.

Poe referred to his stories as "tales of ratiocination". In stories such as these, the primary concern of the plot is ascertaining truth, and the usual means of obtaining the truth is a complex and mysterious process combining intuitive logic, astute observation, and perspicacious inference. "Early detective stories tended to follow an investigating protagonist from the first scene to the last, making the unravelling a practical rather than emotional matter." "The Mystery of Marie Rogêt" is particularly interesting because it is a barely fictionalized account based on Poe's theory of what happened to the real-life Mary Cecilia Rogers.

William Russell (1806–1876) was among the first English authors to write fictitious 'police memoirs', contributing an irregular series of stories (under the pseudonym 'Waters') to Chambers's Edinburgh Journal between 1849 and 1852. Unauthorised collections of his stories were published in New York City in 1852 and 1853, entitled The Recollections of a Policeman. Twelve stories were then collated into a volume entitled Recollections of a Detective Police-Officer, published in London in 1856.

Literary critic Catherine Ross Nickerson credits Louisa May Alcott with creating the second-oldest work of modern detective fiction, after only Poe's Dupin stories themselves, with the 1865 thriller "V.V., or Plots and Counterplots." A short story published anonymously by Alcott, the story concerns a Scottish aristocrat who tries to prove that a mysterious woman has killed his fiancée and cousin. The detective on the case, Antoine Dupres, is a parody of Auguste Dupin who is less concerned with solving the crime as he is in setting up a way to reveal the solution with a dramatic flourish. Ross Nickerson notes that many of the American writers who experimented with Poe's established rules of the genre were women, inventing a subgenre of domestic detective fiction that flourished in its own right for several generations. These included Metta Fuller Victor's two detective novels The Dead Letter (1867) and The Figure Eight (1869). The Dead Letter is noteworthy as the first full-length work of American crime fiction.

Émile Gaboriau was a pioneer of the detective fiction genre in France. In Monsieur Lecoq (1868), the title character is adept at disguise, a key characteristic of detectives. Gaboriau's writing is also considered to contain the first example of a detective minutely examining a crime scene for clues.

Another early example of a whodunit is a subplot in the novel Bleak House (1853) by Charles Dickens. The conniving lawyer Tulkinghorn is killed in his office late one night, and the crime is investigated by Inspector Bucket of the Metropolitan police force. Numerous characters appeared on the staircase leading to Tulkinghorn's office that night, some of them in disguise, and Inspector Bucket must penetrate these mysteries to identify the murderer. Dickens also left a novel unfinished at his death, The Mystery of Edwin Drood.

Dickens's protégé, Wilkie Collins (1824–1889)—sometimes called the "grandfather of English detective fiction"—is credited with the first great mystery novel, The Woman in White. T. S. Eliot called Collins's novel The Moonstone (1868) "the first, the longest, and the best of modern English detective novels... in a genre invented by Collins and not by Poe", and Dorothy L. Sayers called it "probably the very finest detective story ever written". The Moonstone contains a number of ideas that have established in the genre several classic features of the 20th century detective story:

 English country house robbery
 An "inside job"
 red herrings
 A celebrated, skilled, professional investigator
 Bungling local constabulary
 Detective inquiries
 Large number of false suspects
 The "least likely suspect"
 A rudimentary "locked room" murder
 A reconstruction of the crime
 A final twist in the plot

Although The Moonstone is usually seen as the first detective novel, there are other contenders for the honor. A number of critics suggest that the lesser known Notting Hill Mystery (1862–63), written by the pseudonymous "Charles Felix" (later identified as Charles Warren Adams), preceded it by a number of years and first used techniques that would come to define the genre.

Literary critics Chris Willis and Kate Watson consider Mary Elizabeth Braddon's first book, the even earlier The Trail of the Serpent (1861), the first British detective novel. The novel "features an unusual and innovative detective figure, Mr. Peters, who is lower class and mute, and who is initially dismissed both by the text and its characters." Braddon's later and better-remembered work, Aurora Floyd (printed in 1863 novel form, but serialized in 1862–63), also features a compelling detective in the person of Detective Grimstone of Scotland Yard.

Tom Taylor's melodrama The Ticket-of-Leave Man, an adaptation of Léonard by Édouard Brisbarre and Eugène Nus, appeared in 1863, introducing Hawkshaw the Detective. In short, it is difficult to establish who was the first to write the English-language detective novel, as various authors were exploring the theme simultaneously.

Anna Katharine Green, in her 1878 debut The Leavenworth Case and other works, popularized the genre among middle-class readers and helped to shape the genre into its classic form as well as developed the concept of the series detective.

In 1887, Arthur Conan Doyle created Sherlock Holmes, arguably the most famous of all fictional detectives. Although Sherlock Holmes is not the original fictional detective (he was influenced by Poe's Dupin and Gaboriau's Lecoq), his name has become a byword for the part. Conan Doyle stated that the character of Holmes was inspired by Dr. Joseph Bell, for whom Doyle had worked as a clerk at the Edinburgh Royal Infirmary. Like Holmes, Bell was noted for drawing large conclusions from the smallest observations. A brilliant London-based "consulting detective" residing at 221B Baker Street, Holmes is famous for his intellectual prowess and is renowned for his skillful use of astute observation, deductive reasoning, and forensic skills to solve difficult cases. Conan Doyle wrote four novels and fifty-six short stories featuring Holmes, and all but four stories are narrated by Holmes's friend, assistant, and biographer, Dr. John H. Watson.

Golden Age novels

The period between World War I and World War II (the 1920s and 1930s) is generally referred to as the Golden Age of Detective Fiction. During this period, a number of very popular writers emerged, including mostly British but also a notable subset of American and New Zealand writers. Female writers constituted a major portion of notable Golden Age writers. Agatha Christie, Dorothy L. Sayers, Josephine Tey, Margery Allingham, and Ngaio Marsh were particularly famous female writers of this time. Apart from Ngaio Marsh (a New Zealander), they were all British.

Various conventions of the detective genre were standardized during the Golden Age, and in 1929, some of them were codified by the English Catholic priest and author of detective stories Ronald Knox in his 'Decalogue' of rules for detective fiction. One of his rules was to avoid supernatural elements so that the focus remained on the mystery itself. Knox has contended that a detective story "must have as its main interest the unravelling of a mystery; a mystery whose elements are clearly presented to the reader at an early stage in the proceedings, and whose nature is such as to arouse curiosity, a curiosity which is gratified at the end." Another common convention in Golden Age detective stories involved an outsider–sometimes a salaried investigator or a police officer, but often a gifted amateur—investigating a murder committed in a closed environment by one of a limited number of suspects.

The most widespread subgenre of the detective novel became the whodunit (or whodunnit, short for "who done it?"). In this subgenre, great ingenuity may be exercised in narrating the crime, usually a homicide, and the subsequent investigation. This objective was to conceal the identity of the criminal from the reader until the end of the book, when the method and culprit are both revealed. According to scholars Carole Kismaric and Marvin Heiferman, "The golden age of detective fiction began with high-class amateur detectives sniffing out murderers lurking in rose gardens, down country lanes, and in picturesque villages. Many conventions of the detective-fiction genre evolved in this era, as numerous writers—from populist entertainers to respected poets—tried their hands at mystery stories."

John Dickson Carr—who also wrote as Carter Dickson—used the “puzzle” approach in his writing which was characterized by including a complex puzzle for the reader to try to unravel. He created ingenious and seemingly impossible plots and is regarded as the master of the "locked room mystery". Two of Carr's most famous works are The Case of Constant Suicides (1941) and The Hollow Man (1935). Another author, Cecil Street—who also wrote as John Rhode—wrote of a detective, Dr. Priestley, who specialised in elaborate technical devices. In the United States, the whodunit subgenre was adopted and extended by Rex Stout and Ellery Queen, along with others. The emphasis on formal rules during the Golden Age produced great works, albeit with highly standardized form. The most successful novels of this time included “an original and exciting plot; distinction in the writing, a vivid sense of place, a memorable and compelling hero and the ability to draw the reader into their comforting and highly individual world.”

'Whodunit'

A whodunit or whodunnit (a colloquial elision of "Who [has] done it?" or "Who did it?") is a complex, plot-driven variety of the detective story in which the audience is given the opportunity to engage in the same process of deduction as the protagonist throughout the investigation of a crime. The reader or viewer is provided with the clues from which the identity of the perpetrator may be deduced before the story provides the revelation itself at its climax. The "whodunit" flourished during the so-called "Golden Age" of detective fiction, between 1920 and 1950, when it was the predominant mode of crime writing.

Agatha Christie 
Agatha Christie is not only the most famous Golden Age writer, but also considered one of the most famous authors of all genres of all time. At the time of her death in 1976, “she was the best-selling novelist in history.”

Many of the most popular books of the Golden Age were written by Agatha Christie. She produced long series of books featuring detective characters like Hercule Poirot and Miss Marple, amongst others. Her use of basing her stories on complex puzzles, “combined with her stereotyped characters and picturesque middle-class settings”, is credited for her success. Christie's works include Murder on the Orient Express (1934), Death on the Nile (1937), Three Blind Mice (1950) and And Then There Were None (1939).

By country

China 
Through China's Golden Age of crime fiction (1900–1949), translations of Western classics, and native Chinese detective fictions circulated within the country.

Cheng Xiaoqing had first encountered Conan Doyle's highly popular stories as an adolescent. In the ensuing years, he played a major role in rendering them first into classical and later into vernacular Chinese. Cheng Xiaoqing's translated works from Sir Arthur Conan Doyle introduced China to a new type of narrative style. Western detective fiction that was translated often emphasized “individuality, equality, and the importance of knowledge”, appealing to China that it was the time for opening their eyes to the rest of the world.

This style began China's interest in popular crime fiction, and is what drove Cheng Xiaoqing to write his own crime fiction novel, Sherlock in Shanghai. In the late 1910s, Cheng began writing detective fiction very much in Conan Doyle's style, with Bao as the Watson-like narrator; a rare instance of such a direct appropriation from foreign fiction. Famed as the “Oriental Sherlock Holmes”, the duo Huo Sang and Bao Lang become counterparts to Doyle's Sherlock Holmes and Dr. Watson characters.

Japan 
Edogawa Rampo is the first major Japanese modern mystery writer and the founder of the Detective Story Club in Japan. Rampo was an admirer of western mystery writers. He gained his fame in the early 1920s, when he began to bring to the genre many bizarre, erotic and even fantastic elements. This is partly because of the social tension before World War II. In 1957, Seicho Matsumoto received the Mystery Writers of Japan Award for his short story The Face (顔 kao). The Face and Matsumoto's subsequent works began the "social school" (社会派 shakai ha) within the genre, which emphasized social realism, described crimes in an ordinary setting and sets motives within a wider context of social injustice and political corruption. Since the 1980s, a "new orthodox school" (新本格派 shin honkaku ha) has surfaced. It demands restoration of the classic rules of detective fiction and the use of more self-reflective elements. Famous authors of this movement include Soji Shimada, Yukito Ayatsuji, Rintaro Norizuki, Alice Arisugawa, Kaoru Kitamura and Taku Ashibe.

Pakistan 
Ibn-e-Safi is the most popular Urdo detective fiction writer. He started writing his famous Jasoosi Dunya Series spy stories in 1952 with Col. Fareedi & Captain. Hameed as main characters.
In 1955 he started writing Imran Series spy novels with Ali Imran as X2 the chief of secret service and his companions.
After his death many other writers accepted Ali Imran character and wrote spy novels.

Another popular spy novel writer was Ishtiaq Ahmad who wrote Inspector Jamsheed, Inspector Kamran Mirza and Shooki brother's series of spy novels.

Russia
Stories about robbers and detectives were very popular in Russia since old times. The most famous hero in XVIII cent. was Ivan Osipov (1718–after 1756), nicknamed Ivan Kain. Another examples of early Russian detective stories are: "Bitter Fate" (1789) by M. D. Chulkov (1743–1792), "The Finger Ring" (1831) by Yevgeny Baratynsky, "The White Ghost" (1834) by Mikhail Zagoskin, Crime and Punishment  (1866) and The Brothers Karamazov (1880) by Fyodor Dostoevsky. Detective fiction in modern Russian literature with clear detective plots started with The Garin Death Ray (1926–1927) and The Black Gold (1931) by Aleksey Nikolayevich Tolstoy, Mess-Mend by Marietta Shaginyan, The Investigator's Notes by Lev Sheinin. Boris Akunin is a famous Russian writer of historical detective fiction in modern-day Russia.

United States
Especially in the United States, detective fiction emerged in the 1960s, and gained prominence in later decades, as a way for authors to bring stories about various subcultures to mainstream audiences. One scholar wrote about the detective novels of Tony Hillerman, set among the Native American population around New Mexico, "many American readers have probably gotten more insight into traditional Navajo culture from his detective stories than from any other recent books." Other notable writers who have explored regional and ethnic communities in their detective novels are Harry Kemelman, whose Rabbi Small series were set in the Conservative Jewish community of Massachusetts; Walter Mosley, whose Easy Rawlins books are set in the African American community of 1950s Los Angeles; and Sara Paretsky, whose V. I. Warshawski books have explored the various subcultures of Chicago.

Subgenres

Hardboiled

Martin Hewitt, created by British author Arthur Morrison in 1894, is one of the first examples of the modern style of fictional private detective. This character is described as an "'Everyman' detective meant to challenge the detective-as-superman that Holmes represented."

By the late 1920s, Al Capone and the Mob were inspiring not only fear, but piquing mainstream curiosity about the American crime underworld. Popular pulp fiction magazines like Black Mask capitalized on this, as authors such as Carrol John Daly published violent stories that focused on the mayhem and injustice surrounding the criminals, not the circumstances behind the crime. Very often, no actual mystery even existed: the books simply revolved around justice being served to those who deserved harsh treatment, which was described in explicit detail." The overall theme these writers portrayed reflected "the changing face of America itself."

In the 1930s, the private eye genre was adopted wholeheartedly by American writers. One of the primary contributors to this style was Dashiell Hammett with his famous private investigator character, Sam Spade. His style of crime fiction came to be known as "hardboiled", which is described as a genre that "usually deals with criminal activity in a modern urban environment, a world of disconnected signs and anonymous strangers." "Told in stark and sometimes elegant language through the unemotional eyes of new hero-detectives, these stories were an American phenomenon."

In the late 1930s, Raymond Chandler updated the form with his private detective Philip Marlowe, who brought a more intimate voice to the detective than the more distanced "operative's report" style of Hammett's Continental Op stories. Despite struggling through the task of plotting a story, his cadenced dialogue and cryptic narrations were musical, evoking the dark alleys and tough thugs, rich women and powerful men about whom he wrote. Several feature and television movies have been made about the Philip Marlowe character. James Hadley Chase wrote a few novels with private eyes as the main heroes, including Blonde's Requiem (1945), Lay Her Among the Lilies (1950), and Figure It Out for Yourself (1950). The heroes of these novels are typical private eyes, very similar to or plagiarizing Raymond Chandler's work.

Ross Macdonald, pseudonym of Kenneth Millar, updated the form again with his detective Lew Archer. Archer, like Hammett's fictional heroes, was a camera eye, with hardly any known past. "Turn Archer sideways, and he disappears," one reviewer wrote. Two of Macdonald's strengths were his use of psychology and his beautiful prose, which was full of imagery. Like other 'hardboiled' writers, Macdonald aimed to give an impression of realism in his work through violence, sex and confrontation. The 1966 movie Harper starring Paul Newman was based on the first Lew Archer story The Moving Target (1949). Newman reprised the role in The Drowning Pool in 1976.

Michael Collins, pseudonym of Dennis Lynds, is generally considered the author who led the form into the Modern Age. His PI, Dan Fortune, was consistently involved in the same sort of David-and-Goliath stories that Hammett, Chandler, and Macdonald wrote, but Collins took a sociological bent, exploring the meaning of his characters' places in society and the impact society had on people. Full of commentary and clipped prose, his books were more intimate than those of his predecessors, dramatizing that crime can happen in one's own living room.

The PI novel was a male-dominated field in which female authors seldom found publication until Marcia Muller, Sara Paretsky, and Sue Grafton were finally published in the late 1970s and early 1980s. Each author's detective, also female, was brainy and physical and could hold her own. Their acceptance, and success, caused publishers to seek out other female authors.

Inverted 

An inverted detective story, also known as a "howcatchem", is a murder mystery fiction structure in which the commission of the crime is shown or described at the beginning, usually including the identity of the perpetrator. The story then describes the detective's attempt to solve the mystery. There may also be subsidiary puzzles, such as why the crime was committed, and they are explained or resolved during the story. This format is the opposite of the more typical "whodunit", where all of the details of the perpetrator of the crime are not revealed until the story's climax.

Police procedural

Many detective stories have police officers as the main characters. These stories may take a variety of forms, but many authors try to realistically depict the routine activities of a group of police officers who are frequently working on more than one case simultaneously. Some of these stories are whodunits; in others, the criminal is well known, and it is a case of getting enough evidence.

In the 1940s the police procedural evolved as a new style of detective fiction. Unlike the heroes of Christie, Chandler, and Spillane, the police detective was subject to error and was constrained by rules and regulations. As Gary Huasladen says in Places for Dead Bodies, "not all the clients were insatiable bombshells, and invariably there was life outside the job." The detective in the police procedural does the things police officers do to catch a criminal. Writers include Ed McBain, P. D. James, and Bartholomew Gill.

Historical mystery

Historical mystery is set in a time period considered historical from the author's perspective, and the central plot involves the solving of a mystery or crime (usually murder). Though works combining these genres have existed since at least the early 20th century, many credit Ellis Peters's Cadfael Chronicles (1977–1994) for popularizing what would become known as the historical mystery.

A variation on this is Josephine Tey's The Daughter of Time. In it, Scotland Yard Inspector Alan Grant—who considers himself a good judge of faces—is surprised to find that what he considers to be the portrait of a sensitive man is in reality a portrait of Richard III, who murdered his brother's children in order to become king. The story details his attempt to get to the historical truth of whether Richard III is the villain he has been made out to be by history. The novel was awarded the top spot in the Top 100 Crime Novels of All Time by the UK Crime Writers' Association and the number 4 spot in The Top 100 Mystery Novels of All Time Mystery Writers of America

Cozy mystery

Cozy mystery began in the late 20th century as a reinvention of the Golden Age whodunit; these novels generally shy away from violence and suspense and frequently feature female amateur detectives. Modern cozy mysteries are frequently, though not necessarily in either case, humorous and thematic (culinary mystery, animal mystery, quilting mystery, etc.)

This style features minimal violence, sex, and social relevance; a solution achieved by intellect or intuition rather than police procedure, with order restored in the end; honorable and well bred characters; and a setting in a closed community. Writers include Agatha Christie, Dorothy L. Sayers, and Elizabeth Daly.

Serial killer mystery
Serial killer mystery might be thought of as an outcropping of the police procedural. There are early mystery novels in which a police force attempts to contend with the type of criminal known in the 1920s as a homicidal maniac, such as a few of the early novels of Philip Macdonald and Ellery Queen's Cat of Many Tails. However, this sort of story became much more popular after the coining of the phrase "serial killer" in the 1970s and the publication of The Silence of the Lambs in 1988. These stories frequently show the activities of many members of a police force or government agency in their efforts to apprehend a killer who is selecting victims on some obscure basis. They are also often much more violent and suspenseful than other mysteries.

Legal thriller

The legal thriller or courtroom novel is also related to detective fiction. The system of justice itself is always a major part of these works, at times almost functioning as one of the characters. In this way, the legal system provides the framework for the legal thriller as much as the system of modern police work does for the police procedural.  The legal thriller usually starts its business with the court proceedings following the closure of an investigation, often resulting in a new angle on the investigation, so as to bring about a final outcome different from the one originally devised by the investigators. In the legal thriller, court proceedings play a very active, if not to say decisive part in a case reaching its ultimate solution. Erle Stanley Gardner popularized the courtroom novel in the 20th century with his Perry Mason series. Contemporary authors of legal thrillers include Michael Connelly, Linda Fairstein, John Grisham, John Lescroart, Paul Levine, Lisa Scottoline, and Scott Turow.

Locked room mystery

The locked room mystery is a subgenre of detective fiction in which a crime—almost always murder—is committed under circumstances which it was seemingly impossible for the perpetrator to commit the crime and/or evade detection in the course of getting in and out of the crime scene. The genre was established in the 19th century. Edgar Allan Poe's "The Murders in the Rue Morgue" (1841) is considered the first locked-room mystery; since then, other authors have used the scheme. The crime in question typically involves a crime scene with no indication as to how the intruder could have entered or left, i.e., a locked room. Following other conventions of classic detective fiction, the reader is normally presented with the puzzle and all of the clues, and is encouraged to solve the mystery before the solution is revealed in a dramatic climax.

Occult

Occult detective fiction is a subgenre of detective fiction that combines the tropes of detective fiction with those of supernatural horror fiction.  Unlike the traditional detective, the occult detective is employed in cases involving ghosts, demons, curses, magic, monsters and other supernatural elements. Some occult detectives are portrayed as knowing magic or being themselves psychic or in possession of other paranormal powers.

Modern criticism

Preserving story secrets
Even if they do not mean to, advertisers, reviewers, scholars and aficionados sometimes give away details or parts of the plot, and sometimes—for example in the case of Mickey Spillane's novel I, the Jury—even the solution. After the credits of Billy Wilder's film Witness for the Prosecution, the cinemagoers are asked not to talk to anyone about the plot so that future viewers will also be able to fully enjoy the unravelling of the mystery.

Plausibility and coincidence
For series involving amateur detectives, their frequent encounters with crime often test the limits of plausibility. The character Miss Marple, for instance, dealt with an estimated two murders a year; De Andrea has described Marple's home town, the quiet little village of St. Mary Mead, as having "put on a pageant of human depravity rivaled only by that of Sodom and Gomorrah". Similarly, TV heroine Jessica Fletcher of Murder, She Wrote was confronted with bodies wherever she went, but most notably in her small hometown of Cabot Cove, Maine; The New York Times estimated that, by the end of the series' 12-year run, nearly 2% of the town's residents had been killed. It is arguably more convincing if police, forensic experts or similar professionals are made the protagonist of a series of crime novels.

The television series Monk has often made fun of this implausible frequency. The main character, Adrian Monk, is frequently accused of being a "bad luck charm" and a "murder magnet" as the result of the frequency with which murder happens in his vicinity.

Likewise Kogoro Mori of the manga series Detective Conan got that kind of unflattering reputation. Although Mori is actually a private investigator with his own agency, the police never intentionally consult him as he stumbles from one crime scene to another.

The role and legitimacy of coincidence has frequently been the topic of heated arguments ever since Ronald A. Knox categorically stated that "no accident must ever help the detective" (Commandment No. 6 in his "Decalogue").

Effects of technology
Technological progress has also rendered many plots implausible and antiquated. For example, the predominance of mobile phones, pagers, and PDAs has significantly altered the previously dangerous situations in which investigators traditionally might have found themselves.

One tactic that avoids the issue of technology altogether is the historical detective genre. As global interconnectedness makes legitimate suspense more difficult to achieve, several writers—including Elizabeth Peters, P. C. Doherty, Steven Saylor, and Lindsey Davis—have eschewed fabricating convoluted plots in order to manufacture tension, instead opting to set their characters in some former period. Such a strategy forces the protagonist to rely on more inventive means of investigation, lacking as they do the technological tools available to modern detectives.

Conversely, some detective fiction embraces networked computer technology and deals in cybercrime, like the Daemon novel series by Daniel Suarez.

Detective Commandments
Several authors have attempted to set forth a sort of list of “Detective Commandments” for prospective authors of the genre.

According to "Twenty Rules for Writing Detective Stories," by Van Dine in 1928: "The detective story is a kind of intellectual game. It is more—it is a sporting event. And for the writing of detective stories there are very definite laws—unwritten, perhaps, but nonetheless binding; and every respectable and self-respecting concocter of literary mysteries lives up to them. Herewith, then, is a sort of credo, based partly on the practice of all the great writers of detective stories, and partly on the promptings of the honest author's inner conscience." Ronald Knox wrote a set of Ten Commandments or Decalogue in 1929, see article on the Golden Age of Detective Fiction.

A general consensus among crime fiction authors is there is a specific set of rules that must be applied for a novel to truly be considered part of the detective fiction genre. As noted in "Introduction to the Analysis of Crime Fiction", crime fiction from the past 100 years has generally contained 8 key rules to be a detective novel:
 A crime, most often murder, is committed early in the narrative
 There are a variety of suspects with different motives
 A central character formally or informally acts as a detective
 The detective collects evidence about the crimes and its victim
 Usually the detective interviews the suspects,  as well as the witnesses
 The detective solves the mystery and indicates the real criminal
 Usually this criminal is now arrested or otherwise punished

Influential fictional detectives

Sherlock Holmes

Sherlock Holmes is the British fictional detective created by Sir Arthur Conan Doyle. After first appearing in A Study in Scarlet, the Sherlock Holmes stories were not an immediate success. However, after being published in the Strand Magazine in 1891, the detective became unquestionably popular. Following the success of Sherlock Holmes, many mystery writers imitated Doyle's structure in their own detective stories and copied Sherlock Holmes's characteristics in their own detectives.

Sherlock Holmes as a series is perhaps the most popular form of detective fiction. Doyle attempted to kill the character off after twenty-three stories, but after popular request, he continued to pen the Holmes tales. The popularity of Sherlock Holmes extends beyond the written medium. For example, the BBC-produced TV series Sherlock gained a very large following after first airing in 2010, imbuing a renewed interest in the character in the general public. Because of the popularity of Holmes, Conan Doyle was often regarded as being “as well-known as Queen Victoria”.

Hercule Poirot

Hercule Poirot is a fictional Belgian private detective, created by Agatha Christie. As one of Christie's most famous and long-lived characters, Poirot appeared in 33 novels, one play (Black Coffee), and more than 50 short stories, published between 1920 and 1975. Hercule Poirot first appeared in The Mysterious Affair at Styles, published in 1920, and died in Curtain, published in 1975, which is Agatha Christie's last work. On August 6, 1975, The New York Times published the obituary of Poirot's death with the cover of the newly published novel on their front page.

C. Auguste Dupin

Le Chevalier C. Auguste Dupin is a fictional character created by Edgar Allan Poe. Dupin made his first appearance in Poe's "The Murders in the Rue Morgue" (1841), widely considered the first detective fiction story. He reappears in "The Mystery of Marie Rogêt" (1842) and "The Purloined Letter" (1844).

C. Auguste Dupin is generally acknowledged as the prototype for many fictional detectives that were created later, including Sherlock Holmes by Arthur Conan Doyle and Hercule Poirot by Agatha Christie. Conan Doyle once wrote, "Each [of Poe's detective stories] is a root from which a whole literature has developed... Where was the detective story until Poe breathed the breath of life into it?"

Ellery Queen

Ellery Queen is a fictional detective created by American writers Manfred Bennington Lee and Frederic Dannay, as well as the joint pseudonym for the cousins Dannay and Lee. He first appeared in The Roman Hat Mystery  (1929), and starred in more than 30 novels and several short story collections. During the 1930s and much of the 1940s, Ellery Queen was possibly the best known American fictional detective.

Detective debuts and swan songs
Many detectives appear in more than one novel or story. Here is a list of a few debut stories and final appearances.

Books
Bloody Murder: From the Detective Story to the Crime Novel – A History by Julian Symons 
Stacy Gillis and Philippa Gates (Editors), The Devil Himself: Villainy in Detective Fiction and Film, Greenwood, 2001. 
The Manichean Investigators: A Postcolonial and Cultural Rereading of the Sherlock Holmes and Byomkesh Bakshi Stories by Pinaki Roy, New Delhi: Sarup and Sons, 2008, 
Killer Books by Jean Swanson & Dean James, Berkley Prime Crime edition 1998, Penguin Putnam Inc. New York 
Delightful Murder: A Social History of the Crime Story by Ernest Mandel, 1985. Univ. of Minnesota Press.
Clifford's War: The Bluegrass Battleground by J. Denison Reed

See also

Closed circle of suspects
List of Ace mystery double titles
List of Ace mystery letter-series single titles
List of Ace mystery numeric-series single titles
List of crime writers
List of detective fiction authors
List of female detective characters
Mafia
Mystery film

References

Further reading

An exhibition of detective fiction , Monash University Library

 
Crime fiction
Literary genres
 Detective fiction
Film genres